Silas Stafford (born April 27, 1986) is an American rower. He participated in the 2012 Summer Olympics in London where he competed in the Men's Pair event together with his teammate Thomas Peszek. They finished second in the B finals, earning them an eighth place overall.

References

1986 births
Living people
Rowers at the 2012 Summer Olympics
American male rowers
Olympic rowers of the United States
Cambridge University Boat Club rowers
People from Santa Rosa, California